Emigrate! Emigrate! is a 1975 album by the music group The Irish Rovers. The album cover was nominated for a Juno Award.

Track listing 
Side 1:
"The Passing of the Gale"
"Yellow Gals"
"Paddy's Green Shamrock Shore"
"Farewell to Carlingford"
"Mary of Dungloe"
"Emigration Medley"
Side 2:
"Cobblers"
"Paddy On the Railway" (Gordon Lightfoot)
"Canadian Railroad Trilogy"
"Northern Rake"
"Children of Hate"
"Catch Another Butterfly"
"The Gypsy"
"60 Seconds to Get Out: When Irish Eyes Are Smiling / Too Ra Loo Ra Loo Ral (That's an Irish Lullaby)"

External links
The Irish Rovers Official Website
The Balladeers

The Irish Rovers albums
1975 albums
Attic Records albums